Jerry Stephen Crider (September 2, 1941 – April 4, 2008) was a pitcher in Major League Baseball who played for the Minnesota Twins and Chicago White Sox. He was born in Sioux Falls, South Dakota.

In a two-season career, Crider posted a 5–7 record with a 4.51 ERA in 53 appearances, including nine starts, giving up 64 runs (four unearned) on 132 hits and 49 walks while striking out 56 in  innings of work.

Following his baseball career, Crider moved to Mexico and opened a hunting business. He died in Phoenix, Arizona, at the age of 66 and was buried in Mexico.

See also
1969 Minnesota Twins season
1970 Chicago White Sox season

External links
, or Retrosheet, or Pelota Binaria (Venezuelan Winter League)

1941 births
2008 deaths
Águilas Cibaeñas players
American expatriate baseball players in the Dominican Republic
Baseball players from South Dakota
Bismarck-Mandan Pards players
Cardenales de Lara players
American expatriate baseball players in Venezuela
Charlotte Hornets (baseball) players
Chicago White Sox players
Denver Bears players
Erie Sailors players
Florida Instructional League Twins players
Hawaii Islanders players
Major League Baseball pitchers
Minnesota Twins players
Orlando Twins players
Phoenix Giants players
South Dakota State Jackrabbits baseball players
Sportspeople from Sioux Falls, South Dakota
Tucson Toros players
Wilson Tobs players
Wytheville Twins players